The Tipkai River is a north and Himalayan tributary of the Brahmaputra River in the Indian state of Assam. It rises in the Bhutan hills, flows through the Kokrajhar district and Dhubri district of Assam and joins the Brahmaputra River at Chatakurachar of Dhubri district.

References 

Rivers of Assam
Rivers of India